Tovomitopsis faucis is a species of flowering plant in the family Clusiaceae. It is found only in Panama.

References

faucis
Endemic flora of Panama
Data deficient plants
Taxonomy articles created by Polbot
Taxobox binomials not recognized by IUCN